Dahn is a municipality in the Südwestpfalz District (South-West Palatinate), in Rhineland-Palatinate, Germany.

Dahn may also refer to:
Dahn (surname)
Dahn Ben-Amotz (1924–1989), Israeli radio broadcaster
Dahn yoga 
Castles of Dahn, Germany
Erlenbach bei Dahn, Germany
Fischbach bei Dahn, Germany
House of Dahn, noble house in Germany